Olam Tzafuf (Crowded World) is a 1983 album by Israeli rock band HaClique.

Track list
 "Kol Haemet"
 "Mondina"
 "Hey Yaldon"
 "Yalda Mefuneket"
 "Et Mi At Ohevet"
 "Ani Avud"
 "Al Tadliku Li Ner"
 "Nimas Li / Soarey Haimperya"
 "Bear Hug"
 "Olam Tzafuf"

References

1983 albums